Yasmeen Hanoosh is an academic, fiction writer, and translator from Iraq. She was born in Basra in 1978. She moved to the United States in 1995, subsequently obtaining a BA, MA and PhD (in Middle Eastern Studies) from the University of Michigan. The title of her doctoral thesis, submitted in 2008, was "The Politics of Minority: Chaldeans between Iraq and America". She is currently a professor of Arabic at Portland State University.

Hanoosh is the author of the Arabic short story collection أرض الخيرات الملعونة (Land of Cursed Riches, Al-Ahliyyah 2021). Her Arabic short stories have appeared on Kikah Magazine, Banipal Magazine, Al-Jadid Newspaper among others, and have been translated into English, Spanish, and Italian. Hanoosh is also a translator of literary works from Arabic to English. In 2002, she won the Arkansas Arabic Translation Prize for her translation of Scattered Crumbs, a novel by the Iraqi writer Muhsin al-Ramli. In 2010, Hanoosh won a fellowship from the National Endowment for the Arts to translate Closing His Eyes, a short story collection by writer and fellow-Basraite Luay Hamza Abbas. Her translations have appeared in Banipal and the Iowa Review among others.

See also
 List of Arabic-English translators

References

1978 births
Iraqi emigrants to the United States
Living people
Arabic–English translators
Iraqi academics
People from Basra
University of Michigan alumni
Portland State University faculty